The Volkswagen Passat for the North American and Chinese markets (internally designated Volkswagen New Midsize Sedan, or NMS while under development) is a mid-size sedan that debuted in January 2011 at the Detroit Auto Show. It replaced the B6 Passat in the North American market. The Passat NMS was marketed in North America, the Middle East, South Korea and China, with no wagon/estate version available. In China, it is sold alongside the long-wheelbase version of the European Passat known as the Magotan.

At its introduction, the Passat NMS was part of Volkswagen Group's strategy to sell over 800,000 vehicles per year in the North American market by 2018. While it is larger, the model is more downscale compared to the European-market Passat to achieve a lower price point in order to penetrate the mainstream mid-size sedan market in the North American market.

The second-generation Passat for North America and China diverged into two different models, both released in 2019. The North American Passat continued to use the same platform with the A32/A33 Passat NMS introduced in 2011, making it a reskinned version of its predecessor. The Chinese-market Passat launched in 2019 is built on a completely different platform, which is the Volkswagen Group MQB, and has been lengthened in wheelbase and overall length compared to its predecessor.



First generation (A32/A33; 2011) 

Volkswagen released a sketch of the Passat NMS in February 2009 and a more detailed, second sketch on 28 October 2009. The Passat NMS reflects a design language developed by Walter de Silva, the Italian design chief for the Volkswagen Group, and Klaus Bischoff, the German design leader for the Volkswagen brand. The Passat NMS interior borrows design elements from the European Passat, e.g., the traditional clock.

The vehicle was developed by SAIC-Volkswagen and Volkswagen Passenger Cars, and it sits on an extended version of the European car’s platform, which makes it  longer,  wider and therefore offers larger cabin space.

In the United States, it is produced in Volkswagen Group of America's new Chattanooga, Tennessee production facility using 80% US-sourced parts. The new facility is a "flex plant" which will allow for the production of vehicles based on the NMS and MQB platforms.

The American version of the 2013 model year Volkswagen Passat made its way to Middle Eastern markets, namely Qatar, Saudi Arabia, Oman and the United Arab Emirates, by the summer of 2012. The five-seater sedan is available in four trim levels, all with a  2.5-litre 5-cylinder engine and an automatic transmission only.

In China, the new model is built by SAIC-Volkswagen at its Nanjing factory and is marketed as a more upscale model with some interior and exterior differences to the North American model, such as wood-trimmed steering wheel, rear air vents, and LED accented headlights.

Facelift 
Volkswagen refreshed the North American Passat in 2015 for the 2016 model year with styling and technology updates, including revised hood, front fenders, front and rear bumpers, and trunklid.

The Passat now offers optional LED headlights and taillights, a black-accented front bumper, a rear diffuser-like piece and 19-inch wheels.

The updated dashboard features the company's MIB II system (modular infotainment platform) with two sizes of touch screens available, depending on option package. These screens also will feature proximity sensors to pop up the relevant controls as the hand gets closer to the screen. The system is set to offer Volkswagen's Car-Net connectivity system, with Apple CarPlay, Android Auto, and MirrorLink compatibility, which allows connection to a smartphone.

The revised Passat featured as standard equipment a rearview camera as well as automatic post-collision braking, which prevents the car from pinballing from an accident and crashing into other objects after an initial impact. Adaptive cruise control, forward-collision warning with autonomous emergency braking, a blind-spot monitor with rear traffic alert, lane-departure warning, and parking steering assist are all available depending on trim level.

Engines

North America 
In Canada and the United States, the Passat NMS was initially released with a 2.5-liter 5-cylinder engine, 2.0-liter TDI engine and 3.6-liter VR6 engine. For the 2014 model year, a new 1.8-liter TSI 4-cylinder engine replaced the 2.5-liter inline-5 in North America. For the 2015 model year, a new 2.0-liter EA288 TDI with increased power replaced the previous EA189 2.0-liter TDI in North America. Due to the Volkswagen emissions scandal, TDI models were permanently discontinued after the 2015 model year.

The 2016 Passat was planned to offer the same three engine choices featured in the outgoing car: the base-model 1.8-liter TSI turbocharged four-cylinder, the 3.6-liter VR6, and the 2.0-liter TDI diesel four-cylinder. The 1.8 T will do  highway with the automatic transmission. Following the company's emissions scandal, VW halted sales of 2.0-liter TDI-equipped vehicles. The 2.0-liter TSI was offered in place of the TDI.

For 2018, the previous 1.8-liter TSI 4-cylinder engine for base Passat models has been replaced by a 2.0-liter TSI 4-cylinder engine, sourced from the second-generation Volkswagen Tiguan. Models with the 3.6 VR6 engine were discontinued after the 2018 model year.

China 
In China, the NMS is offered with a base 1.4-liter TSI available with a 5-speed manual or 7-speed DSG. The 1.8-liter variant was available with the 6=speed automatic or 7-speed DSG gearbox and the 2.0-liter TSI and 3.0-liter VR6 come standard with 6- and 7-speed DSG gearboxes.

Reception
The Passat NMS won the 2012 Motor Trend Car of the Year. The 2013 Passat TDI sets new Guinness World Record for fuel economy under the non-hybrid car category. It achieved a fuel consumption of only 3.02 liters on 100 kilometers (77.99 mpg).

In a March 2012 comparison test by Car and Driver, the Volkswagen Passat NMS came in first place out of six cars. In a November 2012 comparison by the same magazine with three since-redesigned competitors, the Passat placed last.

In another 2012 comparison test by Motor Trend, the Volkswagen Passat NMS came in first place out of six cars.

Recall 
On November 23, 2020, Passats from 2016 to 2019 model years were recalled since the front seat back adjustment levers may not be engaged correctly, increasing risks of injuries.

Second generation

North America (2019) 

For the 2020 model year, the Passat NMS received a major change, with revised exterior styling and wheel combinations, a suite of standard driver assistance technologies, and a 6.33-inch touchscreen infotainment system with next-generation VW CarNet 4G LTE in-vehicle telematics.

Volkswagen decided not to design the second generation Passat NMS on the Volkswagen Group MQB platform that underpins most Volkswagen products, meaning that the vehicle is essentially a reskinned version of the earlier model. The revised Passat NMS does not offer a fully digital LCD instrument cluster or an 8-speed automatic transmission that are offered on other VW models. The second generation Passat NMS is exclusive to North America, as China gets its own version of Passat. The Passat had previously been discontinued in Mexico after the 2018 model year and this revised Passat is not sold in that market, with the Jetta taking its place.

Only the SEL offers full leather-trimmed seating surfaces, a Fender premium audio system and Park Distance Control (PDC). The R-Line sports a unique front fascia, as well as larger alloy wheels and tires. The 2020 Passat went on sale at Volkswagen dealerships nationwide in the fall of 2019.

In the Canadian market, the Passat is offered in three trim levels: Comfortline, Highline and Execline (available with the optional R-Line package).

Apart from the North American market, this version of the Passat is also available in the Middle East.

Discontinuation and Limited Edition 
After initially planning to discontinue the Passat in 2023, Volkswagen ended Passat production in the United States after the 2022 model year due to slow sales and the rising popularity of crossovers and SUVs. The final build rolled off the Chattanooga production line in December 2021. To commemorate the end of the Passat nameplate and production in the United States (which the brand had continuously sold since 1973), Volkswagen offered a Passat Limited Edition with 1,973 produced in four different color combinations. The production figures for the Limited Edition Passat signify the following:

 423 (Racing Green Metallic): The telephone area code (423) for the Chattanooga, Tennessee area, where the NMS Volkswagen Passat is produced.
 411 (Kings Red Metallic): The chassis code (411) for the original first-generation Passat.
 524 (Pure White Clear Coat): The date (May 24, 2011) that the assembly plant in Chattanooga began production of the Passat.
 615 (Platinum Gray Metallic): The number of generations of Passat produced (6), the number of generations of Passat produced at the Chattanooga assembly plant (1), and the number of decades that the Volkswagen Passat has been sold in the United States (5).

China (2019) 

Revealed on October 12, 2018 by SAIC Volkswagen, the Chinese market 2019 Passat replaces the Passat NMS in China. Despite the high resemblance between the Chinese and North American Passats, they are completely different models based on different platforms. The Chinese market 2019 Passat is built on the newer Volkswagen Group MQB platform together with third generation Magotan, which is a long-wheelbase version of the European B8 Passat. Trim levels are known as the 280 TSI, 330 TSI and 380 TSI. 280 TSI models receive the 1.4-liter EA211 engine, while 330 TSI and 380 TSI models receive the 2.0-liter EA888 engine. All models are available with 7-speed DSG gearbox as standard.

GTE

2022 model year facelift
For the 2022 model year, the Passat built by Shanghai Volkswagen is giving the Passat a facelift in the Chinese market. The updated model gets a restyled chrome front grille with honeycomb-shaped chrome inserts, along with updated LED headlights and a cleaner front bumper design. As for the rear, the updated design features a full-width light bar.

Sales

References

External links

 Official website (United States)

Passat NMS
2010s cars
Cars introduced in 2011
Euro NCAP executive cars
Mid-size cars
Front-wheel-drive vehicles
Sedans
Motor vehicles manufactured in the United States
Cars powered by VR engines